Garratt v Ikeda [2002] 1 NZLR 577 is a cited case in New Zealand regarding where a contract is cancelled under the Contractual Remedies Act 1979, if the deposit has not been paid, it is still payable, despite section 8(3)(a).

Background
Garratt agreed to purchase Ikeda's property for $1.83 million, with a 10% deposit, payable in 3 instalments.

After paying the first two instalments totaling $50,000, Garratt defaulted on the final $130,000 payment due on the deposit. As a result, Ikeda cancelled the sale, and resold the property to another party for $400,000 more than Garratt had agreed to purchase the property.

With the sale now cancelled, Garratt requested Ikeda to refund the $50,000 he had paid on the deposit. Ikeda refused, despite the fact that he had resold the property for a $400,000 profit.

Garratt eventually sued for his deposit back.

Held
The court ruled that section 8(3)(a) did not apply here, as the deposit was a performed obligation at the date of the cancellation. Relief under section 9 for the $400,0000 resale profit, was also refused.

References

Court of Appeal of New Zealand cases
New Zealand contract case law
2001 in case law
2001 in New Zealand law